Tibshelf is a village and civil parish in the Bolsover District in Derbyshire, England. Located between the towns of Clay Cross, Shirebrook, Mansfield and Chesterfield. It had a population at the 2001 UK census of 3,548, increasing to 3,787 at the 2011 Census.  Tibshelf shares its boundaries with the villages of Morton, Pilsley, Newton, Teversal and Hardstoft.

The village was the site of the UK's first inland oil well. In the 19th century, coal was discovered, coal mining overtook agriculture as the primary industry in the area, and a local railway system was developed. Two deep mines were sunk, but were under threat of closure for a number of years after a partial cave-in.

Culture and community

Tibshelf has since redeveloped itself into a popular place to live, in part due to its location near the M1 motorway (Tibshelf services was originally named Chesterfield Services, but was rebranded due to being closer to Tibshelf, and after pressure from the local authorities) and its proximity to Nottingham, Sheffield, Derby, Chesterfield, Sutton-in-Ashfield and Mansfield. The route of the closed Great Central Railway line was redeveloped by Derbyshire County Council in the late 1960s and early 1970s, and now forms part of the Five Pits Trail network. These efforts received a Countryside Award in 1970, as indicated by a plaque at nearby Pilsley.

Other leisure highlights include Tibshelf Ponds, which stand at an ex-colliery site.  They are 2 popular and well-stocked fishing ponds, which contain mixed coarse fish and carp. Angling is controlled by Tibshelf and Newton Angling Club.  One pond is available to fish on a day ticket, with the other being permit only.

Tibshelf also has a large cricket field and modern pavilion built there by the behest of Lindsay Tydeswell (now a teacher at Tibshelf Community School), located adjacent to Shetland Road, towards the village's Southern boundary, with Newton.

There are three schools in Tibshelf: Tibshelf Infant and Nursery School, on High Street; Tibshelf Town-End Junior School, on Alfreton Road; and Tibshelf Community School (a secondary school), on Doe Hill Lane.

 Pubs which remain at time of writing are (from West to East) The Crown Hotel, The Royal Oak (as of 2017 re-branded as "The Twisted Oak"), King Edward VII, and The White Hart.  Recently closed pubs include Tibshelf & Newton Miners' Welfare, The Slap and Tickle, The Wheatsheaf and Brook Street Social Club. At its "Pub Peak", Tibshelf had ten such establishments located within its boundary.

The closed public house The Slap and Tickle was demolished in 2014 and construction began on a new building to relocate the Co-Operative store from further up High Street. The Wheatsheaf closed shortly after 2010 and has been converted into private dwellings.

Transport
Two railway stations once served Tibshelf. Tibshelf & Newton was on a branch line of the Midland Railway (later part of the LMS) from Westhouses & Blackwell on the Erewash Valley Line to Teversal, opened in 1863 and later extended to Mansfield Woodhouse. This line closed to passengers in 1930 but remained open for freight and coal trains for many years afterwards; the route is now a footpath and the main station building still stands.

Tibshelf Town was opened in 1893 by the Manchester, Sheffield & Lincolnshire Railway (later part of the Great Central Railway and subsequently the LNER), on its line to Annesley, later part of the Great Central Main Line to London, optimistically reflecting Tibshelf's aspirations to obtain official town status. Tibshelf never did become a town but the station kept this name throughout its operating life.  It closed in 1963, the line itself in 1966. The collieries in Tibshelf had closed in the 1930s, although coal mining continued to be a major source of employment for the village, with a significant number of Tibshelf's inhabitants working at local pits in the early 1980s prior to the government induced collapse of the coal industry in that decade.

There was a third station in the parish, situated on the Midland's Erewash Valley Line, serving the villages of Stonebroom and Morton but named Doe Hill after the small hamlet in which it is situated. This station closed in 1960.

A fourth station existed near the "Woodend" public house. Whilst it straddles the county boundary, the station building at platform level was in Tibshelf parish. The roadside booking hall is in Nottinghamshire.

Notable residents 
William Egan - former Wales soccer international, died here in 1946.
Tom Hulatt – runner in the famous race when the 4 minute mile record was broken. He finished third.

See also
Listed buildings in Tibshelf

References 

The history and gazetteer of the county of Derby By Stephen Glover

External links 

 Historical images of Tibshelf

Bolsover District
History of the petroleum industry in the United Kingdom
Science and technology in Derbyshire
Villages in Derbyshire